Three hundred and eighty-six people have participated in the Yukon Quest, an annual international 1,000-mile sled dog race between Fairbanks, Alaska and Whitehorse, Yukon. It has been called the "most difficult sled dog race in the world" and the "toughest race in the world". The race's route follows the Yukon River for much of its course and travels over four mountains: King Solomon's Dome, Eagle Summit, American Summit, and Rosebud Summit. Its length is equivalent to the distance between England and Africa, and the distance between some checkpoints is equivalent to the breadth of Ireland.

Yukon Quest attracts anywhere from 18 (in 2014) to 47 (in 1988 and 1989) mushers each year. Because of the competition's difficulty, about one-third of the entrants do not finish. Of the 776 entries from the race's inception in 1984 to 2007, 263 did not finish—a scratch rate of 33.9 percent. The racers have come from various professions: taxicab drivers, a swimming instructor, a coal miner, a tax assessor, a lawyer, fur trappers, journalists, and a car salesman, among others.

At the conclusion of the competition, several racers are recognized by special awards given for various feats performed on the trail. The most notable of these accomplishments is the championship award, given to the winner of the race. Accompanying this is the Golden Harness Award, given to the winner's two lead sled dogs. The next significant award is the Veterinarians Choice Award, which is given to the musher who maintains the best care of his or her dogs during the race, as voted by race veterinarians. Other awards include the Challenge of the North Award—given to the musher who "exemplifies the spirit of the Yukon Quest"—and the sportsmanship award, given to the most sportsmanlike competitor, as chosen by a vote of the mushers. Following the 2011 race, event organizers created the Silver Award to recognize musher Brent Sass for guiding two sled dog teams out of a blizzard atop American Summit. The Silver Award is not an annual award, and to date, Sass is its only recipient.

The Rookie of the Year Award is given to the highest-finishing musher who has never before competed in a Yukon Quest. The Dawson Award consists of four ounces of gold, and it is given to the first musher to reach Dawson City, the midpoint of the race, and complete the race. The final award is the Red Lantern, a $1,000 prize awarded to the last official finisher of that year's race. Two awards have been discontinued: the Kiwanis Award, given to the first musher to cross the Alaska-Yukon border, and the Mayor's Award, given to the Yukon Quest champion.

The latest Yukon Quest champion is Allen Moore, who finished the race in eight days, 14 hours and 21 minutes. Fort St. James, British Columbia musher Jerry Joinson won the 2014 Red Lantern Award by finishing the race in 13 days, 11 hours, and 1 minute. Joinson finished 30 minutes ahead of the final finisher but was assessed a time penalty for using a replacement sled. Rookie musher Matt Hall earned Rookie of the Year honors for his third-place finish. The 22-year-old from Two Rivers, Alaska was also chosen by his fellow competitors for the Veterinarian's Choice and Challenge of the North awards.

Race champion Allen Moore was the first musher to reach Dawson City and thus received $5,000 in gold. His lead dog, Quito, was awarded a golden harness. Race sponsor Northwestel donated $1,000 to a charity of Moore's choosing; Moore selected Special Olympics Yukon. Dawson City musher Brian Wilmshurst received the sportsmanship award for the 2014 race.

The 2011 purse was set at $150,000, but fewer than 15 mushers finished the race that year, meaning the money allotted for the final two prizes were distributed to each of the 13 mushers who finished. The purse peaked at $200,000 in 2007, and winner Lance Mackey took home $40,000. In 2014, the purse was $115,000, but only 11 mushers finished the race, fewer than the number of paying positions. Rather than distribute the extra money to the finishers, the race chose to roll over the unused prize money into the 2015 race. As a result, the 2015 Yukon Quest will have a purse of more than $127,000.

Key

Competitors

Notes
 Days, hours, minutes
 Not adjusted for inflation
 By the time Liss reached Braeburn, the Yukon River had melted, preventing further travel. Therefore, she was considered the last-place finisher despite not completing the entire course.
 Sass suffered a severe concussion  from the race's final checkpoint. He was withdrawn from the race by officials after activating his emergency beacon. He had been running minutes behind the race leader.

References

Bibliography
 Balzar, John. Yukon Alone: The World's Toughest Adventure Race. Henry Holt and Co, January 2000.
 Firth, John. Yukon Quest: The 1000-mile dog sled race through the Yukon and Alaska. Lost Moose Publishing, 1998. Whitehorse, Yukon. pp. 260–273.
 Killick, Adam. Racing the White Silence: On the Trail of the Yukon Quest. Penguin Global, May 2005.
 Yukon Quest International. "2014 Yukon Quest Media Guide" (PDF), Yukonquest.com. Accessed Sept. 3, 2014.
 Yukon Quest International. "2014 Results by Musher" Yukonquest.com. Accessed Sept. 3, 2014.

Yukon Quest